Richfield Township is one of the nine townships of Summit County, Ohio, United States.  The 2000 census found 5,424 people in the township, 2,138 of whom lived in the unincorporated portions of the township.

Geography
Located in the northwestern corner of the county, it borders the following townships and cities:
Brecksville, Cuyahoga County - north
Boston Township - east
Bath Township - south
Granger Township, Medina County - southwest corner
Hinckley Township, Medina County - west
Broadview Heights, Cuyahoga County - northwest

The village of Richfield is located in central Richfield Township.

Name
Statewide, other Richfield Townships are located in Henry and Lucas counties.  It was given the name Richfield due to the large amount of "Oxbalm" or "rich feed" available to feed cattle.

History
It was formed in survey Town 4, Range 12 in the Connecticut Western Reserve.

From 1974 to 1994, Richfield was the home to the Coliseum at Richfield.  The Coliseum was home to the Cleveland Cavaliers (NBA), Cleveland Barons (NHL), Cleveland Crusaders (WHA), Cleveland Force (Major Indoor Soccer League) and Cleveland Thunderbolts (Arena Football League).  The Coliseum was demolished in 1999.

Counties
Richfield Township's land has been in the following counties:

Government
The township is governed by a three-member board of trustees, who are elected in November of odd-numbered years to a four-year term beginning on the following January 1. Two are elected in the year after the presidential election and one is elected in the year before it. There is also an elected township fiscal officer, who serves a four-year term beginning on April 1 of the year after the election, which is held in November of the year before the presidential election. Vacancies in the fiscal officership or on the board of trustees are filled by the remaining trustees.

References

 Author unknown, (1999-2005). County Formation Maps . Retrieved May 2, 2005.
 Extension Data Center, Dept of HCRD, The Ohio State University  Ohio County Profiles. Retrieved May 7, 2005.

External links
Township website
County website